Pasiphila halianthes is a moth in the family Geometridae. It is endemic to New Zealand.

References

Moths described in 1907
halianthes
Moths of New Zealand